A fibrin ring granuloma, also known as doughnut granuloma, is a histopathological finding that is characteristic of Q fever.    On hematoxylin-eosin staining, the fibrin ring granuloma consists of a central lipid vacuole (usually washed-out during fixing and staining, leaving only an empty hole) surrounded by a dense red fibrin ring and epithelioid macrophages.  Fibrin ring granulomas may also be seen in Hodgkin's disease and infectious mononucleosis.

See also
Granuloma

References

Histopathology